Nikos Spyropoulos (born 10 October 1983) is a Greek former professional footballer who played as a left-back.

Club career

Early career
Spyropoulos began his career with PAS Giannina in 2001, where he celebrated a promotion to the Alpha Ethniki during his first season. In three years, he made a total of 33 appearances for the club, all of which in the Beta Ethniki.

Panionios
In summer 2004 he signed for Greek Superleague side Panionios. Eight months later, and while he was about to be transferred to Panathinaikos along with his teammates Alexandros Tziolis and Evangelos Mantzios, he tested positive for elevated testosterone and was initially suspended for two years. This was later attributed to natural causes, but his transfer was cancelled nevertheless. He returned to action one year later and went on to play for 3,5 years for Panionios, earning the reputation of being one of the best left-backs in the Greek championship.

During the summer transfer period of 2007 and the winter period of 2008, Spyropoulos attracted the interest of clubs such as AEK Athens, Olympiacos and Werder Bremen – however a move did not materialize.

Panathinaikos
In January 2008, Spyropoulos moved to Panathinaikos FC for a reported fee of 2 million Εuros.

After some impressive displays during the second half of 07–08 season, Spyropoulos has started the 08–09 season as the main left back for Panathinaikos FC. Henk Ten Cate, the manager had praised his ability by asking a "Spyropoulos for the right side" too, during the pre-season. Spyropoulos main assets are his speed, stamina and the ability to go forward whenever possible. Due to a clause he was not able to play against his previous team Panionios for two years after his transfer to Panathinaikos FC.

Chievo Verona
Two days before the winter transfer window closes, the Greek defender Nikolaos Spyropoulos was presented to the press today at Peschiera's Parc Hotel.  signing for the Italian Serie A side A.C. Chievo Verona. Spyropoulos said: "I'm here too to play my part. I'll try to settle in as quickly as possible, to help Chievo reach their target. I'm a defender but I can play in many positions and I like attacking play. I thank Chievo for giving me the chance to play in Italy. I'll do my best to repay the trust of the chairman and the club." He made two appearances for the club before missing the remainder of the season through injury.

PAOK
An announcement on PAOK’s official Twitter profile confirmed the acquisition of Spyropoulos, who spent the last six months in Italy with Chievo Verona after leaving Panathinaikos during last January’s transfer window. No financial details of Spyropoulos’ contract or terms were revealed by the club, but the Greek international will join the first team for its training camp in Austria starting on Monday.

 He made his debut with the club in December 2013 in a 2-0 away win against PAS Giannina.
On 15 April 2015, his contract was terminated.

International career
His talent was initially ignored by Otto Rehhagel, but in 2007 the elector capped him. Spyropoulos is left-footed and is distinguished by a combination of speed, strength, agility and endurance.

On 17 November 2007 he made his national team debut in the 5–0 Euro 2008 qualifier defeat of Malta coming on for Vasilis Torosidis in the 46th minute.

International goals

Career statistics

Honours
Panathinaikos
Super League Greece: 2009–10
Greek Cup: 2009–10
PAOK
Greek Cup runner-up: 2013–14

Notes

A.  Includes appearances in the Superleague Greece (Alpha Ethniki until 2006) and Beta Ethniki.
B.  Includes appearances in the Greek Cup.
C.  Includes appearances in the UEFA Champions League and UEFA Europa League (UEFA Cup until 2009).
D.  Includes appearances in the Superleague Greece play-offs.

References

External links
2010 FIFA World Cup profile

1983 births
Living people
Footballers from Ioannina
Association football defenders
Association football midfielders
Greek footballers
Greece international footballers
Greek expatriate footballers
Panionios F.C. players
Panathinaikos F.C. players
PAS Giannina F.C. players
A.C. ChievoVerona players
PAOK FC players
Super League Greece players
Serie A players
Football League (Greece) players
UEFA Euro 2008 players
2010 FIFA World Cup players
Expatriate footballers in Italy